The name giant rat has been applied to various species of large rats (or animals that appear similar to large rats) and may refer to:

Africa 
 Gambian pouched rat, Cricetomys gambianus
 Giant pouched rat, genus Cricetomys
 Malagasy giant rat, Hypogeomys antimena

Asia and New Guinea 
 Flores giant rat, Papagomys armandvillei
 Mountain giant Sunda rat, Sundamys infraluteus
 Giant cloud rats, southern giant slender-tailed cloud rat Phloeomys cumingi and northern Luzon giant cloud rat Phloeomys pallidus
 White-eared giant rats, western white-eared giant rat, Hyomys dammermani and eastern white-eared giant rat Hyomys goliath
 Woolly rats, genus Mallomys
 Large bamboo rat, Rhizomys sumatrensis

South America 
 Coypu, nutria, or river rat,. Myocastor coypus
 Capybara, genus Hydrochoerus
 Woolly giant rat, Kunsia tomentosus

Extinct species 
 East Timor giant rat, an extinct species, genus Coryphomys
 Tenerife giant rat, an extinct species, Canariomys bravoi
 Fossorial giant rat, Kunsia fronto

See also
Gigantism, the phenomenon of animals to grow to giant sizes relative to their species
Rat

Animal common name disambiguation pages